Center for Strategic Studies is an Iranian think tank on strategy issues. It is the research arm of the Iranian President's office.
The current head of organization is Mohammadsadegh Khayatian.

History
CSS was established in 1997 as a counterpart of Center for Strategic Research.

Challenges
The center was led by Hesamoddin Ashna in Rouhani's Government, but Ashna resigned after an internal interview with Iran's Foreign Minister Javad Zarif was leaked.

See also
 Hassan Rouhani
 Mohammad Mousavi Khoeiniha
 Saeed Hajjarian

References

External links
 Center for Strategic Studies

Political research institutes
1997 establishments in Iran
Research institutes established in 1997
Research institutes in Iran
Think tanks based in Iran
Public policy in Iran
Strategic studies